The 1980 Humboldt State Lumberjacks football team represented Humboldt State University during the 1980 NCAA Division II football season. Humboldt State competed in the Far Western Conference (FWC).

The 1980 Lumberjacks were led by head coach Bud Van Deren in his 15th season. They played home games at the Redwood Bowl in Arcata, California. Humboldt State finished with a record of two wins and eight losses (2–8, 1–4 FWC). The Lumberjacks were outscored by their opponents 147–261 for the season.

Schedule

Notes

References

Humboldt State
Humboldt State Lumberjacks football seasons
Humboldt State Lumberjacks football